Wild Winship's Widow is a 1917 American silent comedy film directed by Charles Miller and starring Dorothy Dalton, Rowland V. Lee and Joe King. With no holdings in archives, it is a lost film.

Cast
 Dorothy Dalton as Catherine Winship
 Rowland V. Lee as Archibald Herndon
 Joe King as Morley Morgan
 Lillian Hayward as Aunt Minerva
 Alice Terry as Marjory Howe

References

Bibliography
 Flom, Eric. L. Silent Film Stars on the Stages of Seattle: A History of Performances by Hollywood Notables. McFarland, 2009.

External links
 

1917 films
1917 comedy films
1910s English-language films
American silent feature films
Silent American comedy films
American black-and-white films
Triangle Film Corporation films
Films directed by Charles Miller
1910s American films